Ashhurst is a town and outlying suburb of Palmerston North, in the Manawatū-Whanganui region of New Zealand's North Island.

Location

Ashhurst is sited 14 kilometres northeast of the Palmerston North city centre. The town stands under the Ruahine Ranges, beneath Wharite Peak, which is the most notable peak on the south end of the Ruahine Range, upon which is the television and radio transmitter.

Demographics

There were 1,074 households. There were 1,428 males and 1,506 females, giving a sex ratio of 0.95 males per female. The median age was 35.9 years (compared with 37.4 years nationally), with 726 people (24.7%) aged under 15 years, 492 (16.8%) aged 15 to 29, 1,320 (45.0%) aged 30 to 64, and 396 (13.5%) aged 65 or older.

Ethnicities were 89.0% European/Pākehā, 18.6% Māori, 3.1% Pacific peoples, 2.8% Asian, and 1.4% other ethnicities (totals add to more than 100% since people could identify with multiple ethnicities).

The proportion of people born overseas was 12.9%, compared with 27.1% nationally.

Although some people objected to giving their religion, 56.3% had no religion, 32.8% were Christian, 0.6% were Hindu, 0.1% were Buddhist and 2.0% had other religions.

Of those at least 15 years old, 384 (17.4%) people had a bachelor or higher degree, and 438 (19.8%) people had no formal qualifications. The median income was $34,300, compared with $31,800 nationally. The employment status of those at least 15 was that 1,179 (53.4%) people were employed full-time, 294 (13.3%) were part-time, and 66 (3.0%) were unemployed.

Transport

Ashhurst's importance stems from its location at the western end of the Manawatu Gorge. As such, it was close to the easiest road and rail link between the east and west coasts of the southern North Island. However, the Gorge has been closed since April 2017 and the road link to the east coast from Ashhurst is now via Saddle Road.

There are four buses on weekdays and one on Saturdays linking Palmerston North with Ashhurst.

Parks and reserves

 Ashhurst Domain – A large multipurpose park which includes a camping ground, a lookout to the wind farm, a cemetery and canine area.
 Durham Street Reserve and McCraes Bush Reserve
 Lincoln Park – The home ground to the local rugby team Ashhurst-Pohangina RFC

History
Ashhurst was named for Lord Henry Ashhurst, who owned land in the immediate area. The Māori name for the area is Raukawa, after the native aromatic plant ''Pseudopanax edgerleyi, whereas for the town it is Otangaki.

Local and central government representation

Former Ashhurst-Fitzherbert Ward
Ashhurst-Fitzherbert Ward was Palmerston North's largest ward covering the area from James Line to part way through the Manawatu Gorge, to just north of Ashhurst township. Wards were abolished in Palmerston North in 2013.

Central government

 Rangitīkei is represented by New Zealand National Party MP Ian McKelvie.
 Te Tai Hauāuru is represented by New Zealand Labour Party MP Adrian Rurawhe.

Education

Notable people

 Andre Taylor, rugby player
 Mark McGrath, darts player

References

External links
 https://web.archive.org/web/20050418224210/http://www.ashhurstnz.com/

Populated places in Manawatū-Whanganui
Suburbs of Palmerston North
Populated places on the Manawatū River